Chong Nonsi is one of the two khwaengs (sub-districts) of Yan Nawa District, Bangkok rim Chao Phraya River. In late 2018 it had a population of 48,277 people, with total area of 9.984 km2 (round about 3.854 mi2). It is the location of the Yan Nawa District Office. This Sub-District is also divided into 13 communities.

History and naming

Its name after an ancient temple Wat Chong Nonsi and Khlong Chong Nonsi, a small khlong (canal) that runs through the area and parallel to Naradhiwas Rajanagarindra Road.

The name "Chong Nonsi"  is derived from a folklore titled  "Legend of Lord Uthong" (ตำนานท้าวอู่ทอง). It is said that, Lord Uthong (not to be confused with King Uthong of Ayutthaya) and his wife with his soldiers escaped from Uthong because of cholera. During his journey, he took a rest at a place near a river, they pretended that they were not royal family and he asked his wife to take off her tiara for their own safety. The place that they took a rest was called "Bang Ratklao" (บางรัดเกล้า, "a place where a tiara was taken off") and is later changed to "Bang Kachao" as today. Lord Uthong commanded his soldiers to tie a rope and made a raft to cross the Chao Phraya River. While he was making his way across the river, cholera was rapidly chasing him by climbing the rope. He decided to cut the rope to get rid of cholera. The Lord and his wife settled down at a village for long time so that area was name "Chong Nang Ni" (ช่องนางหนี, "a channel that lady escaped"). It is later called "Chong Nonsi" finally.  Or another folklore, this is a story of an original name of Wat Chong Nonsi. There was a lady who escaped from Burma army invading Ayutthaya. She secretly hid herself in a Buddhist temple and survived. As a result, people called this temple "Wat Nang Ni" (a temple where a lady hid herself). It is later called "Wat Chong Nonsi".

Places of interest
CentralPlaza Rama III
The UP Rama3
Wat Chong Nonsi
Wat Chong Lom
Wat Pho Man Khunaram
Goods and Imitation Goods Museum
Tentacles
Mae Nam Railway Station

References

Yan Nawa district
Subdistricts of Bangkok
Populated places on the Chao Phraya River